Fisher Bastion is a high rectangular massif,  high, between the upper reaches of Potter Glacier and Foster Glacier,  southeast of Mount Huggins in the Royal Society Range of Victoria Land, Antarctica. It was named by the Advisory Committee on Antarctic Names in 1994 after Commander Dwight David Fisher, U.S. Navy,  Commanding Officer of the Naval Support Force, Antarctica, 1987–89; Fisher Peak in Palmer Land was also named after him.

References 

Mountains of Victoria Land
Scott Coast